Pearlena Igbokwe is the chairman of Universal Studio Group, a division of NBCUniversal. She is responsible for all aspects of creative affairs and production for four studios: Universal Television, Universal Content Productions (UCP), NBCUniversal International Studios and Universal Television Alternative Studio.

She is the first woman of African descent to head a major U.S. television studio, as she comes from the Igbo tribe of Nigeria.

Early life and education
Igbokwe was born in Lagos, Nigeria in the 1960s. She lived with her family in a village which was affected by bomber planes while they depended on airlifted food during the Nigerian Civil War. She moved to the United States at the age of six. She earned a Bachelor of Arts degree from Yale University and an MBA from Columbia University.

Career

From June 2016 to September 2020, Igbokwe was president of Universal Television where she oversaw creative development, casting and production for one of the country's largest and most successful studios.  She led the division to new heights with record volume, commercial success and critical acclaim. Some of her programming highlights include Russian Doll, The Good Place, New Amsterdam, The Bold Type, Good Girls, and Dick Wolf’s successful new franchise, FBI and FBI: Most Wanted, among numerous other notable projects.  In a highly competitive landscape, Igbokwe was able to secure pickups for her projects on every major streaming service, a variety of premium cable outlets and every broadcast network.

Before her studio role, Igbokwe served as executive vice president, drama programming, for NBC Entertainment, where she developed the top-rated new broadcast dramas for three out of her four years in the role (Blacklist, Blindspot and This Is Us).

Igbokwe worked at Showtime for 20 years where she was involved in developing the pilot and overseeing the first five seasons of Dexter, Showtime's most popular series ever. She also developed the pilot for Masters of Sex, starring Michael Sheen, and supervised the Emmy Award-winning and critically acclaimed original series Nurse Jackie. In addition, she shepherded Tracey Ullman's State of the Union, Damon Wayans' The Underground, Kirstie Alley's Fat Actress and the television adaptation of the hit feature film Barbershop. She was also instrumental in the five-season run of the hit Showtime series Soul Food, a two-time NAACP Image Award winner for best drama series.

References

Year of birth missing (living people)
Living people
Nigerian media personalities
Igbo television personalities
Residents of Lagos
Nigerian emigrants to the United States
People of the Nigerian Civil War
Yale University alumni
Columbia Business School alumni
1960s births